Louise Uwacu is a Canadian writer and speaker. Author of "The nightmare of a POSITIVISION*; Yes we are dying, but we are still breathing ". Published in the spring of 2009 by AuthorHouse. This book was published 15 years after she fled from Rwanda and became an international traveler on fake passports. She insists that her message is for the young people that will owe all that money their parents have borrowed from China and other banks of this world.   In her own words: "This is the story of how I went from my mother's womb in Rwanda, grew into a rebellious teenager in Kenya, crossed through Europe and became a Fearless woman in North America. Through various travel tales and numerous encounters across three different continents; I am giving you the naked version of me and revealing the hidden side of our dramas and dreams"

Biography
Louise Uwacu was born in Kabgayi, Rwanda, in February 1977. She spent her childhood and attended primary school in Kigali until 1988 when her family moved to Nairobi, Kenya. Where she continued her high school studies at the French school, Lycée Denis Diderot. Her family had just moved back to Rwanda, when shortly after the war, the massacres and genocide of 1994 erupted. After becoming a refugee, she landed in Montreal, Quebec, Canada in 1998 and lived there for 10 years. She currently resides in Vancouver, British Columbia, Canada. Uwacu holds a degree in political science from the University of Quebec in Montreal. It was at her graduation in 2002 that a speaker inspired her to "find out what you want to be before you take on the responsibilities of being that person".

She hosts her own talk shows and continues to write for her own website. She is a gifted speaker and entertainer in at least five languages. She is the co-founder and chief executive officer of the Canadian non-profit organization POSITIVISION. She intends to write and sell more books and eventually build more and more schools for Africa.

She has produced and hosted a documentary titled Positivision in Mali it follows her journey to the villages of Mali in January 2008.

Louise Uwacu has been quoted and featured in several publications including The Guardian, Success for Women Magazine, The Boston Herald.

The nightmare of a POSITIVISION
This is the story of a human being haunted by the nightmares of war, child abuse, separation from family and so much more. And yet, she is still aiming for a peaceful life. She hopes to find freedom in North America. She lands in Canada in 1998 as a refugee aged 21 and with 30 dollars in her pocket, only to find that surviving peace might turn out to be harder and even more challenging than war. Louise Uwacu wants the world to ignore the politicians and beauty pageants participants, who only speak of "world peace" without ever following up with real actions.  She reminds her readers that despite all the nightmares that you might have to go through to get to your dream Life; be comforted in the timeless truth: with a POSITIVISION, success is our only option.

Publications
The Nightmare of a POSITIVISION: Yes We are Dying. But we are still Breathing, 2009

External links
Louise Uwacu 
Louise Uwacu on Facebook
The POS* with Louise
The POS* Lounge
 Louise Uwacu quoted in The Guardian
 Louise Uwacu featured in Success for Women Magazine

Rwandan emigrants to Canada
Canadian non-fiction writers
Canadian women non-fiction writers
Rwandan women writers
Black Canadian writers
Living people
People from Muhanga District
Black Canadian women
Year of birth missing (living people)